Petar Perunović (Serbian Cyrillic: Петар Перуновић) (1880 – 10 June 1952), nicknamed Perun, was a famous Serbian gusle player from Montenegro.

Perunović was born in 1880 at Drenovštica in Pješivci, Princedom of Montenegro, and at an early age displayed an exceptional skill for the gusle, an ancient Balkan instrument. He began taking lessons, given by his mentor Ilija Kontić, at the same time that he was attending grammar school in his native village. In 1900 he left Montenegro for Šabac, Serbia, where his music instructor was R. Tolinger. He brought himself into notice in Belgrade in 1908 by performing before a colossal monument to Prince Mihailo in protest against the Bosnian crisis. In Negotin he graduated from Teacher's College in 1910. His teaching career was interrupted by the two Balkan wars and World War I in which he took active part. After the wars, he began to teach for a short period before leaving for the United States on a prolonged tour of Serbian communities there. In New York City, Cleveland, Detroit, and Chicago, he entertained the early Serbian immigrants with patriotic songs and recorded many albums under the "Serb Gusle" label founded by Serb emigrants from Serbia, Vojvodina, Romanian Banat, Slavonia, Dalmatia, Croatia, Bosnia-Hercegovina, South Serbia, Kosovo, Macedonia, and Montenegro to America.

He died in his native Montenegro in 1952.

Discography 
Serb epic Rebellion against the Dahijas/Turkish Officers, Serb Gusle label founded by Serb emigrants in the U.S., recorded by Marsh Laboratories, Chicago, 1920s.

See also
Dimitrije Karaman
Živana Antonijević
Old Rashko
Tešan Podrugović
Filip Višnjić
Djuro Milutinović the Blind

References

Further reading 
J. Vukmanovic, Smrt guslara P. Perunovica, Pobjeda, 1952.
M. Murko, Tragom srpsko-hrvatske narodne epike, Zagreb, 1951, pp. 144–149

Montenegrin musicians
Serbian guslars
1880 births
1952 deaths
Recipients of the Order of the Cross of Takovo
Montenegrin expatriates in the United States
Serbian expatriates in the United States
Serbian people of Montenegrin descent